The Company Phiten, headquartered in Nakagyo-ku, Kyoto, Japan, sells quasi-drugs, cosmetics, hair care products, sports-related products, health foods, and health goods.

Over View 
AQUA TITAN/AQUA-TITANIUM products worn as necklaces (such as RAKUWA Neck) are well known and used by many famous athletes. Some of the athletes who have made endorsement agreements with Phiten are Yuzuru Hanyu, Hideki Matsuyama,Tomoaki Kanemoto, Yoshio Itoi, Yoshihiro Maru, Tetsuto Yamada, Daichi Osera, Katsuya Kakunaka, Sora Matsushima, Hina Hayata and Hikari Fujita. Athletes who have signed agreements with Phiten in the past include Daisuke Matsuzaka, Yu Darvish, Yukari Baba, Shintaro Fujinami, Yasuyuki Kataoka, Toshiaki Imae, Yuki Saito, Kengo Nakamura, TTsuyoshi Shinjo, Shinnosuke Abe, Shingo Katayama, Randy Johnson, Paula Radcliffe and Naoko Takahashi.

The company makes endorsement agreements exclusively with athletes who need and enjoy Phiten products.

The company also develops and sells sportswear, although the variety and production numbers are very small. The company is also involved in the development of health food products with functional claims.

In 2007, it became the first Japanese company to sign the MLB/Major League Baseball Authentication Program.

Aqua Metal 
Water-soluble metal technology, which disperses metals in water at the nano level, is unique to Phiten, and in addition to AQUA TITAN/AQUA-TITANIUM, AQUA GOLD/AQUA SILVER and other water-soluble metals have been produced.

However, there is still a lack of scientific evidence to support the efficacy of AQUA TITAN/AQUA-TITANIUM, and there has been criticism that AQUA TITAN/AQUA-TITANIUM is nothing more than a placebo effect or a pseudo-science. In 2009, [[Biomarker Science, Inc. published the results of experiments conducted by Kyoto Prefectural University of Medicine, Kyoto Prefectural University, University of California, Los Angeles/UCLA and Professor Martin Corte at Technical University of Braunschweig, which showed that AQUA TITAN/AQUA-TITANIUM material had a certain relaxing effect. In 2013, Professor Toshikazu Yoshikawa of Kyoto Prefectural University of Medicine, who has supported AQUA TITAN/AQUA-TITANIUM research, published a hypothesis that AQUA TITAN/AQUA-TITANIUM may have a balancing effect on the autonomic nervous system. The company's founder, Yoshihiro Hirata, is also responsible for the crystal ring boom.

See also 
Japan Beach Volleyball Federation (sponsors of the JBV Tour)

Notes

External links

Companies established in 1983
Manufacturing companies based in Kyoto
Pseudoscience